Giacinto Scoles  (born 1935 in Torino, Italy) is a European and North American chemist and physicist who is best known for his pioneering development of molecular beam methods for the study of weak van der Waals forces between atoms, molecules, and surfaces.  He developed the cryogenic bolometer as a universal detector of atomic and molecule beams that not only can detect a small flux of molecules, but also responds to the internal energy of the molecules.  This is the basis for the optothermal spectroscopy technique which Scoles and others have used to obtain very high signal-to noise and high resolution ro-vibrational spectra.

Biography
Scoles was born in Italy and raised there through the Second World War. A few years after the war he moved, with his family, to Spain, where Scoles spent his adolescence. He returned to Italy and graduated the University of Genoa in 1959 with a degree in Chemistry. His publication record started with “Vapour Pressure of Isotopic Liquids I” published 1959 in Il Nuovo Cimento. Starting his interdisciplinary research between chemistry and physics, in 1960 he was appointed Assistant Professorship in the Physics Department of the University of Genoa where he taught a lab course and conducted experiments on isotope separation during physical adsorption (physisorption).

In 1961, he changed research area and joined Jan Beenakker’s group at the Kamerlingh-Onnes Laboratorium of Leiden University in the Netherlands. There he coauthored one of the first papers [1] on what became soon known as the Senftleben-Beenakker effect: The influence of an external magnetic or electric field on the transport properties of dilute polyatomic gases.  The idea behind this effect is that every polyatomic molecule – even a simple paramagnetic one like N2 – has a magnetic moment, due to its end-over-end rotation, which can be used as a handle to make it precess in an external magnetic field. If the precession frequency is sufficiently large compared to the collision frequency, the average kinetic cross section will change, and so will the transport properties.  Likewise, for polar molecules one may employ electric fields to achieve the desired precession. This field has yielded a wealth of information on the non-spherical part (i.e. the angle dependence) of the intermolecular potential. In addition, several new phenomena were later discovered that had been believed to be non-existing in neutral gases, like transverse transport effects in a magnetic field, comparable to the Hall effect in electrical conduction.

In 1964, Scoles returned to the University of Genoa as Assistant Professor of Physics. In Genoa he stayed until 1971 and in those years established a renowned molecular beams laboratory devoted to the investigation of intermolecular forces in gases. Most significant was the development of the cryogenic bolometer to detect molecular beams.  Bolometers detect tiny heat input (with noise on the order of 10−14 watts per square root hertz) and had previously been developed as detectors of Infrared Radiation but here they are used to measure the internal and translational energy of a beam of atoms or molecules.  The test apparatus set up together with M. Cavallini and G. Gallinaro [2] offered great advantages with respect to conventional techniques used at that time and reduced the cost of building beam machines.  Scoles and his colleagues published a series of key papers which include the determination of the energy dependence of the integral collision cross section of He scattered by He [3], the observation of “Rainbow Scattering“ between two crossed beams of Argon [4],  the first measurement of orbiting resonances in the scattering between two atoms (Hg and H) [5].

In 1971, Scoles moved to the University of Waterloo, Canada as Professor of Chemistry and Physics.   There, he set up the first successful crossed molecular beam laboratory in Canada.   He help establish the Waterloo Centre for Molecular Beams and Laser Chemistry, the Centre for Surface Science in Technology, as well as the weekly chemical physics seminars and annual Symposium on Chemical Physics, both of which continue to this day.  He was the initial (Acting) Director of the Guelph-Waterloo Centre for Graduate Work in Chemistry, the first true inter-university graduate program in Canada.   Scoles performed crossed beam differential scattering cross-section studies of atom-atom, atom-molecule and molecule-molecule interactions, using his bolometer detector.  He also began using helium atom diffraction to study the structure of surfaces, both of pure crystals which often undergo change from the bulk structure (reconstruction) and also the structure of overlayers of atoms and molecules absorbed on surfaces.  With Terry Gough and then graduate student Roger Miller, Scoles introduced the technique of bolometer-detected optothermal spectroscopy of molecular beams where vibrational excitation of a beam of molecules is detected by the bolometer.  They used this technique to studies vibrational dissociation of a complex of two or more molecules held together by Van der Waals forces.  By the early 1980s, Scoles began the first studies of the spectroscopy of molecules adsorbed in or on clusters of rare gas atoms.

In the mid-to-late 1970s Scoles spent part of his time at the University of Trento, Italy where he established a new molecular beam laboratory. The activity of the Trento lab was mainly focused on opto-thermal spectroscopy and atomic hydrogen scattering experiments.

Scoles moved to Princeton University in 1986.  One of the experiments that Scoles brought to Princeton was the study of IR spectroscopy of molecules attached to inert gas clusters, particularly Ar and Xe clusters. In this work, he developed the now widely used “pickup technique” [6] and set the stage for his later pioneering work on superfluid helium nanodroplets, for which he recently shared the Benjamin Franklin Award in Physics.  The helium experiments, started with students S. Goyal and D. Schutt, provided the first molecular spectra of solutes in liquid helium, a unique superfluid solvent [7]. Frank Stienkemeier joined the group as a postdoc and together with graduate students John Higgins and Carlo Callegari (and sabbatical visitor Wolfgang Ernst) established the “Alkali age” of the group which provided a rich vein to explore chemical dynamics in this fascinating state of mater [8]. Graduate student James Reho brought time resolved spectroscopy techniques into the mix [9].   Erik Kerstel did a thesis on subdoppler spectroscopy of hydrogen bonded complexes, including the first such spectra in the vibrational overtone region [10]. Brooks Pate brought Scoles and Kevin K. Lehmann together for what proved to be a long series of experiments (and many Ph.D. theses) that characterized Intramolecular Vibrational energy Redistribution. They first studied the hydrogen stretching fundamental and first overtone spectral regions and observed Lorentzian lineshapes due to irreversible relaxation for large molecules with a very high density of states [11]. They developed IR-microwave and later IR-IR double resonance methods to provide unambiguous quantum assignments of even highly congested spectra and to reach higher in energy [12]. The work by Andrea Callegari on benzene, long a model system for such studies is noted among many such studies. After this work, Carlo Callegari converted the apparatus into a helium droplet machine, which was used for the first study of overtone vibrational transitions in helium nanodroplets.  Also, the pure rotational spectra of HCCCN and HCN in helium were observed [13].  This established that a single droplet could absorb several thousand photons without "optically pumping" out of resonance.

Scoles was instrumental in the establishment of the Princeton Materials Institute and became a close collaborator of Peter Eisenberger, its first director. Scoles also brought to Princeton his Helium Diffraction Spectrometer for the study of surface structure [14]. His focus turned from inorganic overlayers to the study of self-assembled monolayers, particularly alkane thiols on Au(111) [15]. Scoles collaborated with Eisenberger in using X-Rays as a complementary surface structure tool and showed the power of the combination of the two methods. Scoles developed expertise in atomic force microscopy (AFM) to study surface structure and more recently, tip induced surface modification using the nanografting technique [16,17] which had been previously developed by his former student Gang Yu Liu.  In collaboration with Steve Bernasek, Scoles has also studied the influence of vibrational excitation (again for the first time in the first C-H overtone region) on the sticking probability of a molecule (methane) on a metal surface [18].

Starting in 2003, Scoles returned part-time to Italy, taking appointments at the Trieste  Synchrotron Elettra and the International School for Advanced Studies (SISSA),  In SISSA he joined the Condensed Matter group where he began collaborating on theoretical problems dealing with helium nanodroplets and with physisorption. At the same time, he started an experimental group in Elettra, focusing on nanoscience, with particular attention to self-assembled monolayers and their properties [19,20]. Later, Scoles expanded his research into nanoscale biological processes, biophysics, and nanomedicine, in connection with the local Consortium of Molecular Biomedicine.

Awards and honors
2006 –  Research Prize of the Chemistry Faculty of the University of Bochum
2006 –  Benjamin Franklin Medal in Physics (with Jan Peter Toennies) from the Franklin Institute.
2003 –  Creativity Award from the NSF 2003-5
2004	–  Texas A&M University, Frontiers in Chemical Research Lecturer
2004	–  Moscowitz Lecturer at the University of Minnesota, October 2004
2003	–  Distinguished Visiting Professor, University of Florida, Gainesville.
2003	–  Earle K. Plyler Prize for Molecular Spectroscopy from the American Physical Society (with Kevin K. Lehmann).
2002	–  Peter Debye Award in Physical Chemistry from the American Chemical Society
2001	–  H. E. Gunning Lecturer, Dept. of Chem., University of Alberta
2000	–  Elected Foreign Member of The Royal Netherlands Academy of Arts and Sciences
2000	–  Honorary Science Doctorate from the University of Waterloo
1999	– Samuel M. McElvain Lecturer, University of Wisconsin–Madison
1997	–  Elected Fellow of The Royal Society (United Kingdom)
1996	 –   Recipient of an Honorary Doctorate in Physics from the University of Genoa
1995	–  Recipient of a Senior Fellowship of the Alexander von Humboldt Foundation
1995	– Recipient of the 1995 Lippincott Award of the Optical Society of America, the Coblentz Society, and the Society for Applied Spectroscopy
1986	– Senior Killam Fellowship.

See also
 List of University of Waterloo people

References

[1] J.J.M. Beenakker, G. Scoles, H.F.P. Knaap and R.M. Jonkman, Phys. Lett. 2, 5–6 (1962).
[2] Cavallini M. Gallinaro G. Scoles G., Z.Naturforsch 24a, 1850, (1969).
[3] Dondi, M.G., Scoles, G., Torello, F., Pauly, H., J. Chem. Phys., 51: 392(1969).
[4] Cavallini, M., Gallinaro G., Meneghetti L., Scoles G. and Valbusa U., Chem. Phys. Lett. 7, 303(1970).
[5] Schutte A., Bassi D., Tommasini F. and Scoles G., Phys. Rev. Lett. 29, 979, (1972).
[6] D.J. Levandier, J. McCombie, R. Pursel and G. Scoles, J. Chem. Phys. 86, 7239 (1987).
[7] S. Goyal, D.L. Schutt, and G. Scoles, Phys. Rev. Lett. 69, 933 (1992).
[8] F. Stienkemeier, J. Higgins, W. E. Ernst and G. Scoles, Phys. Rev. Lett. 74(18), 3592–95 (1995).
[9] J. Higgins, C. Callegari, J. Reho, F. Stienkemeier, W. E. Ernst, K. K. Lehmann, M. Gutowski and G. Scoles, Science 273 629–631 (1996).
[10] H. Meyer, E.R.Th. Kerstel, D. Zhuang and G. Scoles, J. Chem. Phys. 90, 4623 (1989).
[11] E. Kerstel, K.K. Lehmann, T.F. Mentel, B.H. Pate and G. Scoles, J. Phys. Chem. 95, 8282 (1991).
[12] E.R. Th. Kerstel, K.K. Lehmann, J. E. Gambogi, X. Yang and G. Scoles. J. Chem. Phys. 99 8559–8570 (1993).
[13] I. Reinhard, C. Callegari, A. Conjusteau, K. K. Lehmann and G. Scoles,  Phys. Rev. Lett. 82, 5036–5039 (1999).
[14] C.E.D. Chidsey, G.-Y. Liu, P. Rowntree and G. Scoles, J. Chem. Phys. 91, 4421 (1989).
[15] N. Camillone III, P. Eisenberger, T.Y.B. Leung, P. Schwartz, G. Scoles, G.E. Poirier and M.J. Tarlov,   J. Chem. Phys. 101, 11031 (1994).
[16] Y. Hu, A. Das, M.H. Hecht, and G. Scoles, Langmuir 21(20), 9103–9109 (2005).
[17] C. Staii, D.W. Wood, G. Scoles, J. Am. Chem. Soc. 130(2), 640–646 (2008).
[18] J. Higgins, A. Conjusteau, G. Scoles, and S.L. Bernasek,  J. Chem. Phys. 114(12), 5277–5283 (2001).
[19] R. Mazzarello, A. Cossaro, A. Verdini, R. Rousseau, L. Casalis, M.F. Danisman, L. Floreano, S. Scandolo, A. Morgante, and G. Scoles, Phys. Rev. Lett. 98(1), Art. No. 016102 (2007).
[20] M. Castronovo, F. Bano, S. Raugei, D. Scaini, M. Dell'Angela, R. Hudej, L. Casalis, and G. Scoles, J. Am. Chem. Soc. 129(9), 2636–2641 (2007).

1935 births
Living people
21st-century American chemists
Italian chemists
Members of the Royal Netherlands Academy of Arts and Sciences
University of Genoa alumni
Fellows of the Royal Society
Spectroscopists
Fellows of the American Physical Society
Academic staff of the University of Waterloo
Princeton University faculty